The Russian National Freestyle Wrestling Championships 2017 (also known as the Russian Nationals 2017) was held in Nazran, Ingushetia, Russia by the Russian Wrestling Federation at the Berd Evloev Arena from 12–14 June 2017.

Medal overview

Medal table

Men's freestyle

See also 

2015 Russian National Freestyle Wrestling Championships
2015 Russian National Greco-Roman Wrestling Championships
2016 Russian National Freestyle Wrestling Championships
2018 Russian National Freestyle Wrestling Championships
Soviet and Russian results in men's freestyle wrestling

References

External links 
 http://www.wrestrus.ru/
 http://www.wrestrus.ru/news/fsbrnews/Novosti_sajta/on_line_videotransljacija_chempionata_rossii_po_vol_noj_bor_be

 
Russian National Freestyle Wrestling Championships
2017 in Russian sport
2017 in sport wrestling
Nazran
June 2017 sports events in Russia